Nayef Al Khater (born May 10, 1978) is a Qatari football player. He currently plays for Al Wakrah as a defender.

Biography
He took part in the 1995 FIFA U-17 World Championship, representing Qatar. He also represented the senior team from 2001 to 2004, earning 17 caps and 1 goal.

Al Khater played his entire career in Al Wakrah, only going on loan temporarily to other Qatari clubs. He is one of the most capped players of Al Wakrah.

Club career statistics
Statistics accurate as of 23 February 2012

References

External links 

 Player profile - Soccerpunter.com
 

1978 births
Living people
Qatari footballers
Qatar international footballers
Al-Wakrah SC players
Al Sadd SC players
Al-Rayyan SC players
Qatar Stars League players
Association football defenders
Footballers at the 1998 Asian Games
Asian Games competitors for Qatar